William O'Meara may refer to:

William O'Meara (bishop), 18th-century Irish Catholic bishop
William O'Meara (hurler) (born 1998), Irish hurler